Astan-e Karud (also Romanized as Āstān-e Karūd and Āstān Karūd; also known as Arsinkirūd, Ashin Kirūd, Āstānak Rūd, and Āstāneh Karūd) is a village in Zanus Rastaq Rural District, Kojur District, Nowshahr County, Mazandaran Province, Iran. At the 2006 census, its population was 76, in 24 families.

References 

Populated places in Nowshahr County